MVGR College of Engineering  is a technological institute located in Vizianagaram, Andhra Pradesh, India. Previously it was affiliated to Jawaharlal Nehru Technological University, Kakinada,
but now MVGRCE has turned into an autonomous institution.

Currently the college has 11 academic departments covering Undergraduate programs (B.Tech) in Chemical Engineering, Computer Science, Electronics and Communications Engineering, Electrical and Electronics Engineering, Information Technology, Mechanical Engineering, Civil Engineering and Postgraduate programs (M.Tech) in Product Design and Manufacturing, VLSI, Communication Engineering, Data Science, CNIS, Power Systems, and Structural Engineering and Management.

History 
MANSAS was founded on 12 November 1958. After the demise of RAJASAHEB. Maharajah Alak Narayan Society of Arts and Science (MANSAS) is an Educational Trust founded by Dr. (late) P.V.G Raju, Raja Saheb of Vizianagaram.
"As part of this, Maharaj Vijayram Gajapatha Raj College of Engineering, of shot from the tree of MANSAS in the year 1997". MVGR college of Engineering turned to Autonomous in the year 2015

Location 
The college is located at Vijayaram Nagar, Chintalavalsa outskirts of Vizianagaram, about {cvt|5|km}} from the city and adjacent to the Vizianagaram - Visakhapatnam Highway. The Institution is affiliated to Jawaharlal Nehru Technological University (JNTU), Kakinada and is recognized by All India Council for Technical Education (AICTE), New Delhi.
This College is managed by Principal Dr.K.V.LAKSHMIPATHI RAJU, who has vast experience in teaching.
Campus along with general amenities like gym, playgrounds, bank etc.

Departments and Centres 
MVGR College of Engineering has the following Departments and Centres:
Engineering
 Computer Science and Engineering
 Chemical Engineering
 Civil Engineering
 Electrical Engineering
 Electronics and Communication Engineering
 Information Technology
 Mechanical Engineering
 Computer Science and Information Technology
 Artificial Intelligence and Machine Learning 
 Computer Science and Data Science
 Computer Science and IoT with block chain technologies 
M.Tech in
 VLSI 
 Machine Design
 Computer Science and Engineering
 Computer Networks and Information Security
 Structural Engineering
 Power systems
And MBA

Infrastructure 
It has engaged 250 full-time teaching staff.

Achievements 
The college has moved forward from a beginning with 4 departments and 200 students in 1997 to a current regular intake of 1128 students. It offers bachelor's degree in Civil, Chemical, Computer Science, Electronics and Communication, Electrical & Electronics, Information Technology and Mechanical Engineering. It also offers Postgraduate courses in Engineering and Management

Student life

The campus has facilities for training in games and sports like athletics, cricket, football, basketball, volleyball, tennis, badminton, squash and table tennis. Students choose between National Cadet Corps (NCC), National Service Scheme (NSS) as a compulsory extra curricular activity.

References 

Engineering colleges in Andhra Pradesh
Universities and colleges in Vizianagaram district
Educational institutions established in 1997
1997 establishments in Andhra Pradesh
Uttarandhra